The Championnats de Granby, currently sponsored as Championnats Banque Nationale de Granby, is a professional tennis tournament played on outdoor hard courts. It is currently part of the Association of Tennis Professionals (ATP) Challenger Tour and a WTA 250 tournament the WTA Tour. It has been held annually in Granby, Quebec, Canada, since 1993 for men, and 2011 for women. The event was known as the Challenger de Granby until the 2022 edition.

Past finals

Men's singles

Women's singles

Men's doubles

Women's doubles

External links
Official website

 
ATP Challenger Tour
ITF Women's World Tennis Tour
Tennis tournaments in Canada
Hard court tennis tournaments
Sport in Granby, Quebec
Tennis in Quebec
Recurring sporting events established in 1993
1993 establishments in Quebec